Nikos Karakostas (born 22 September 1976) is a Greek football player who currently plays for Levadiakos FC.

Career
Born in Karditsa, Karakostas began playing football for Levadiakos F.C. in 1995, and would spend most of his career with the club. The club's veteran goalkeeper, Karakostas only appeared in a few matches during the 2009–10 Greek Super League season due to injury.

References

External links
 Profile at Insports.gr
 Guardian Football
Profile at epae.org

1976 births
Living people
Greek footballers
Levadiakos F.C. players
Anagennisi Karditsa F.C. players
Association football goalkeepers
Footballers from Karditsa